Queenie of Hollywood is a 1931 American comedy film directed by Fatty Arbuckle.

Cast
 Virginia Brooks
 Rita Flynn
 Jeanne Farrin
 Queenie the Dog as Queenie

See also
 Fatty Arbuckle filmography

External links

1931 films
Films directed by Roscoe Arbuckle
1931 comedy films
Educational Pictures short films
American black-and-white films
Films about dogs
American comedy short films
Films with screenplays by Jack Townley
1930s English-language films
1930s American films